Qarn Alam is a location in Oman, near Ghaba. It is known as the land of oil and gas. It is nearby to Mahout, Duqm, Masirah Island

It is served by Qarn Alam Airport.

Coordinates:

References

Geography of Oman